ent-Sandaracopimaradiene synthase (EC 4.2.3.29, OsKS10, ent-sandaracopimara-8(14),15-diene synthase) is an enzyme with systematic name ent-copalyl-diphosphate diphosphate-lyase [ent-sandaracopimara-8(14),15-diene-forming]. This enzyme catalyses the following chemical reaction

 ent-copalyl diphosphate  ent-sandaracopimara-8(14),15-diene + diphosphate

ent-Sandaracopimaradiene is a precursor of the rice oryzalexins A-F.

References

External links 
 

EC 4.2.3